Lestradea perspicax is a species of cichlid endemic to Lake Tanganyika where it occurs in shallow waters over sandy substrates in the northern portion of the lake.  This species can reach a length of  TL.  It can also be found in the aquarium trade.

References

perspicax
Taxa named by Max Poll
Fish described in 1943
Taxonomy articles created by Polbot